Stephan Kunzelmann (born 22 November 1978) is a retired German freestyle swimmer who won three medals in the  freestyle relay at the 2000 FINA World Swimming Championships (25 m) and 2000 and 2002 European Aquatics Championships. He competed in the same event at the 2000 and 2004 Summer Olympics and finished fourth and eights, respectively. He also won two medals in the 4×50 m freestyle and medley relays at the European Short Course Swimming Championships 1998.

References

1978 births
Living people
German male swimmers
German male freestyle swimmers
Olympic swimmers of Germany
Swimmers at the 2000 Summer Olympics
Swimmers at the 2004 Summer Olympics
Medalists at the FINA World Swimming Championships (25 m)
European Aquatics Championships medalists in swimming
Sportspeople from Hanover
20th-century German people
21st-century German people